Anthony Nelson (born 31 July 1997) is a Caymanian football player who plays as a striker for Caymanian club  Sunset FC and the Cayman Islands national team.

International career
He made his debut for the Cayman Islands national football team on 22 March 2019 in a CONCACAF Nations League qualifier against Montserrat, as a 79th-minute substitute for Andrés Ruiz. He made two subsequent appearances against Cuba, starting on one occasion.

Career statistics

References

External links
 
 

1997 births
Living people
Association football midfielders
Caymanian footballers
People from Grand Cayman
Caymanian expatriate footballers
Expatriate footballers in England
Caymanian expatriate sportspeople in England
Expatriate footballers in Wales
Caymanian expatriate sportspeople in Wales
Tigers FC (Cayman Islands) players
Bognor Regis Town F.C. players
Llanelli Town A.F.C. players
National League (English football) players
Cymru Premier players
Cayman Islands international footballers